Jay Allison is an American independent public radio producer and broadcast journalist.  His work has been featured on radio programs such as This American Life, as well as National Public Radio's All Things Considered, and Morning Edition.  Allison is the executive director of Atlantic Public Media, which produced and administers Transom.org and the Public Radio Exchange PRX, and is the "Curator" and co-producer, with Dan Gediman, of This I Believe.  He is also the "Curator" of the radio program, Heart of the Land .

He was the 1996 recipient of the CPB's Edward R. Murrow Award for outstanding contributions to public radio, the only independent producer to have received it. He has also received five Peabody Awards.

Allison and Gediman collected some of the best essays from the This I Believe series and published them in the books This I Believe: The Personal Philosophies of Remarkable Men and Women and This I Believe II.

Notes and references

External links
 
 Transom
 Public Radio Exchange
 Public Media Maverick Jay Allison (2007), on Thought Cast

NPR personalities
Year of birth missing (living people)
Living people